The Arc de Berà (sometimes written Barà) is a triumphal arch some 20 km north-east of the city of Tarragona, Catalonia, Spain, close to Roda de Berà. This monument is part of the Archaeological Ensemble of Tarraco, which was added to the UNESCO's list of World Heritage Sites in 2000. It stands on the line of what was the Via Augusta, now the N-340 road.

Its name derives from the count Berà. It is a triumphal arch with a single opening consisting of a central body on a podium, decorated with fluted pilasters crowned by Corinthian capitals. The upper part of the construction is an entablature made up of architrave, frieze and cornice. The stone used is probably from a local quarry.

The monument was built as a result of the will of Lucius Licinius Sura and it was erected in the reign of Augustus, around 13 BCE. The surviving inscription reads: “Ex testamento L(uci) Licini L(uci) f(ilii) Serg (ia tribu) Surae consa[...]”. It is thought it was dedicated to Augustus or to his genius, and that it marked the limit of the district of Tarraco.

References

Ancient Roman triumphal arches
Bera
Ancient Roman buildings and structures in Catalonia
Buildings and structures completed in the 1st century BC
Augustus